Pen-y-Pass is a mountain pass in Snowdonia, Gwynedd, north-west Wales.  It is a popular location from which to walk up Snowdon, as three of the popular routes (the Miners Track, the Pyg Track and the ascent via Crib Goch) can be started here. Glyder Fawr, to the north, is also accessible from here.

Situated at the high point of the Llanberis Pass at an elevation of  – about a third of the height of Snowdon – the road was built in the 1830s to allow ore from the mines on Snowdon to be transported to Llanberis. It would be taken down the Miners Track to a store-house at Pen-y-Pass first. Previously, the miners had had to move the ore over the Snowdon summit and down to Beddgelert, which is located at around a third the height of Snowdon.

The Llanberis pass road extends beyond Pen-y-Pass to join the Beddgelert-to-Capel Curig road at the Pen-y-Gwryd hotel. That notable climbing hotel was used as a base by Sir John Hunt, Baron Hunt and his team whilst training for the successful 1953 expedition to Mount Everest and equipment and autographs from that and other expeditions may be seen in the Everest Room.

The former Gorphwysfa Hotel at Pen-y-Pass is now a youth hostel, bar and café operated by YHA, and opposite is an information centre and café and a Snowdonia National Park-run car park. There is also a car park half way down Llanberis Pass in Nant Peris village as well as others in Llanberis village. There is a park and ride bus service to Pen-y-pass car park, which is the hub of the year-round Sherpa bus network provided by Express Motors and GHA Coaches. This service links Pen-y-Pass to Llanberis, Capel Curig, Betws-y-Coed, Beddgelert, Porthmadog, Rhyd Ddu and Waunfawr.

References
 The mountains of England and Wales, Volume 1 Wales John and Ann Nuttal
 Youth Hostels Association Guidebook, 2005-06

External links

 Walks From Pen-y-Pass and general info
  A Walk down the Llanberis Pass
  Around Pen-y-Pass

Beddgelert
Llanberis
Mountain passes of Gwynedd
Mountain passes of Snowdonia
Roads in Gwynedd
Roads in Snowdonia
Scenic routes in the United Kingdom
Tourism in Gwynedd
Tourism in Snowdonia